Appu is a common nickname in India for the feminine given names Apurva, Apeksha, Aparna, Aparijita. It is also a masculine nickname, but prevalent mostly in the Southern region of India.

It may refer to:

Appu (Hurrian), a character in Hurrian mythology
 Appu, the elephant mascot, see 1982 Asian Games

Films
 Appu (2000 film), a Tamil film directed by Vasanth
 Appu (2002 film), a Kannada film directed by Puri Jagannath

Persons
 Appu Nedungadi (1863–1933), India Malayalam writer
 Appu Kuttan (born 1941), Indian-American philanthropist, consultant, and author
 Puran Appu (1812–1848), Sri Lankan independence activist
 P. S. Appu (1929–2012), Indian civil servant
 Puneeth Rajkumar, (1975–2021), colloquially known as Appu

See also
 Appu Chesi Pappu Koodu, a 1958 Telugu film
 Asian-Pacific Postal Union (APPU), an International organisation
 Appukutty (born 1984), Indian actor and comedian